The Journal of the National Cancer Institute (JNCI) is a peer-reviewed medical journal covering research in oncology that was established in August 1940. It is published monthly by Oxford University Press and is edited by Patricia A. Ganz. It was merged with Cancer Treatment Reports in January 1988. JNCI used to be the official journal of the National Cancer Institute (NCI); however, in 1996, the NCI and JNCI agreed to grow apart. Over the next five years, JNCI became independent of the NCI.

A related publication is Journal of the National Cancer Institute Monographs (JNCI Monographs), established in 1959, which publishes manuscripts from cancer and cancer-related conferences, as well as groups of papers on specific subjects related to cancer. In January 1986, Cancer Treatment Symposia was merged with JNCI Monographs. Additionally, JNCI Cancer Spectrum (JNCI CS) is a fully open access journal, which was established in 2017. It is published bimonthly by Oxford University Press and is edited by Ronald Chen.

History 
The history of JNCI is linked to that several other journals. A full history of JNCI and JNCI Monographs is presented below.

1940: Journal of the National Cancer Institute established by the National Cancer Institute (NCI)
1959: National Cancer Institute Monograph established by the NCI
1959: Cancer Chemotherapy Reports founded by the Cancer Chemotherapy National Service Center (CCNSC)
1966: Cancer Chemotherapy Reports is taken over by the NCI
1968: Cancer Chemotherapy Reports is split into three parts: Cancer Chemotherapy Reports, Part 1,  Cancer Chemotherapy Reports, Part 2 and Cancer Chemotherapy Reports, Part 3
1976: The three parts of Cancer Chemotherapy Reports are merged with each other and renamed Cancer Treatment Reports
1983: Cancer Treatment Symposia established by the NCI
1986: Cancer Treatment Symposia merged with National Cancer Institute Monograph, which is renamed NCI Monographs
1988: Journal of the National Cancer Institute absorbs Cancer Treatment Reports
1990: NCI Monographs renamed Journal of the National Cancer Institute Monographs
1996: Oxford University Press starts to take over Journal of the National Cancer Institute and Journal of the National Cancer Institute Monographs over a period of roughly five years

Abstracting and indexing
JNCI is indexed and abstracted in:

According to the Journal Citation Reports, the journal has a 2014 impact factor of 12.583, ranking it 8th out of 211 journals in the category "Oncology".

JNCI Monographs is indexed and abstracted in

References

External links
JNCI website
JNCI Monographs website
Journal of the National Cancer Institute, Published by Oxford University Press, Is Not Affiliated With NCI

Oxford University Press academic journals
Oncology journals
Biweekly journals
Publications established in 1940
English-language journals